The XBQM-108A was an experimental VTOL unmanned aerial vehicle developed by the United States Navy during the 1970s. Although the XBQM-108A successfully conducted unmanned, tethered flight tests and the project was cancelled before any free flights could be conducted.

Design and development
The XBQM-108 project was initiated in 1975 by the Aviation and Surface Effects Department of the U.S. Navy's David W. Taylor Naval Ship Research and Development Center. The project was intended to demonstrate the practicality of the 'Vertical Attitude Take-Off and Landing' (VATOL), or 'tailsitter' flight profile for remotely piloted vehicles, as the Navy believed the increasing threat posed by cruise missiles required that aviation assets be dispersed among additional ships of the fleet, which would possess limited space for aviation operations as opposed to conventional aircraft carriers.

Based on the MQM-74 Chukar target drone, the XBQM-108A was modified with a revised, delta wing with canard control surfaces. The XBQM-108A was fitted with a thrust vectoring system based on the use of vanes that deflected the engine's exhaust; the aircraft retained the Chukar's recovery parachute and radio guidance system, with the addition of a radar altimeter and midcourse guidance unit based on that of the AGM-84 Harpoon anti-ship missile.

Operational history
The XBQM-108A undertook its first, tethered flight on September 29, 1976. The flight, using fuel supplied through the tether from  drums, was successful and demonstrated that the VATOL flight profile for unmanned vehicles was practical. However, the project was cancelled before further testing could be conducted; the XBQM-108A conducted no free flights, or transitions to horizontal flight.

Specifications

See also

References
Notes

Bibliography

 
 

BQM-108
1960s United States experimental aircraft
Tailsitter aircraft
Single-engined jet aircraft
Unmanned aerial vehicles of the United States
Cancelled military aircraft projects of the United States
Delta-wing aircraft
Aircraft first flown in 1976